Elections to North Tyneside Metropolitan Council took place on 6 May 2010 on the same day as other council elections in England and the UK general election.

North Tyneside Council is elected "in thirds" which means one councillor from each three-member ward is elected each year with a fourth year when the mayoral election takes place.

One third of the councillors were elected in 2006. The Conservative Party gained an overall majority of one on the council after the 2008 election which previously had been under no overall control, and also won the following mayoral election, in which Linda Arkley returned to office. The 2010 election proved victorious for the Labour Party, which gained 8 seats and lost none. The Conservatives lost 7 seats and the Liberal Democrats lost one. The Council returned to no overall control as the Conservatives lost their majority and fell into second place. The swing across the council on average was 10.7% from the Conservatives to Labour, against the national trend of the Westminster elections taking place the same day.

Battle Hill

A further by-election was held in September 2010. Details can be found here.

Benton

Camperdown

Chirton

Collingwood

Cullercoats

Howdon

Killingworth

Longbenton

Monkseaton North

Monkseaton South

Northumberland

Preston

Riverside

St Mary's

Tynemouth

Valley

Wallsend

Weetslade

Whitley Bay

2010 English local elections
May 2010 events in the United Kingdom
2010
21st century in Tyne and Wear